Helenium flexuosum is a North American plant species in the daisy family known by the common name purple sneezeweed. It is widespread across much of eastern and central United States and Canada, from Nova Scotia west to Ontario, Minnesota, and Kansas, south to Florida, Louisiana, and eastern Texas.

Helenium flexuosum is a perennial herb up to 100 cm (40 inches) tall. One plant can produce 80 or more flower heads in a branching array. Each head has up to 700 yellow or purple disc florets, sometimes with no ray florets, sometimes with 8-13 yellow, red, purple, or brown ray florets. The species grows in fields, ditches, and streambanks.

References

External links
United States Department of Agriculture Plants Profile
Photo of herbarium specimen at Missouri Botanical Garden, collected in Missouri in 1988
Illinois Wildflowers
Connecticut Botanical Society
Illinois Natural History Survey

flexuosum
Flora of North America
Plants described in 1838
Taxa named by Constantine Samuel Rafinesque